Ron Webster (born 21 June 1943, in Belper) is an English former association football player, who spent nearly all his career playing for his local team Derby County. Webster played at right back. Webster was always a fans' favourite because of his hard tackles and effort. Seth Johnson, a recent ex-Derby player was compared to him for his hard working attitude on the pitch. He is rated by many people as being one of the most loyal Derby County players ever for his services and contribution to the club.

He played 455 league games for Derby, which is the second highest in Derby County's history, (only Kevin Hector played more), from 1960–1978, scoring 7 times. Ron was part of the Brian Clough and Peter Taylor era at Derby, and then the just as successful Dave Mackay era. Webster was an integral part of a near unbeatable defence. Webster retired in 1977 after his last game (a 1–1 draw with Chelsea). Webster stayed on at Derby as coach, but is now retired.

On 30 March 2009, he was voted the greatest right back in Derby County history.

References

External links
 
 Minnesota Kicks stats

1943 births
Living people
People from Belper
Footballers from Derbyshire
English footballers
English expatriate footballers
Derby County F.C. players
English Football League players
North American Soccer League (1968–1984) players
Minnesota Kicks players
Association football defenders
English expatriate sportspeople in the United States
Expatriate soccer players in the United States